Achthophora lumawigi is a species of beetle in the family Cerambycidae. It was described by Stephan von Breuning in 1980. It is known from the Philippines.

References

Lamiini
Beetles described in 1980
Taxa named by Stephan von Breuning (entomologist)